The 1972 Macdonald Brier, Canada's national men's curling championship was held March 6 to 11, 1972 at St. John's Arena in St. John's, Newfoundland.

Team Manitoba, who was skipped by Orest Meleschuk easily won the event, after posting a 9-1 round robin record, only losing to Quebec's Bill Kent rink, which finished second.<ref>The Brier, Bob Weeks, pg 120</ref> Meleschuk and his rink of Dave Romano, John Hanesiak and Pat Hailley went on to win a gold medal at the 1972 Air Canada Silver Broom World Curling Championship, amidst controversy.

Teams
The teams are listed as follows:

Round Robin standingsFinal Round Robin standingsRound Robin results
All draw times are listed in Newfoundland Standard Time (UTC-03:30).

Draw 1Monday, March 6, 3:00 pmDraw 2Monday, March 6, 8:00 pmDraw 3Tuesday, March 6, 9:00 amDraw 4Tuesday, March 6, 2:30 pmDraw 5Wednesday, March 7, 2:30 pmDraw 6Wednesday, March 7, 8:00 pmDraw 7Thursday, March 8, 9:00 amDraw 8Thursday, March 8, 2:30 pmDraw 9Thursday, March 8, 8:00 pmDraw 10Friday, March 9, 9:00 amDraw 11Friday, March 9, 2:30 pm''

Awards

All-Star Team 
The media selected the following curlers as All-Stars.

Ross G.L. Harstone Award
The Ross Harstone Award was presented to the player chosen by their fellow peers as the curler who best represented Harstone's high ideals of good sportsmanship, observance of the rules, exemplary conduct and curling ability.

References

External links
Soudog Curling
Curling Canada Youtube video
Coverage

1972 in Canadian curling
1972
Curling in Newfoundland and Labrador
Sport in St. John's, Newfoundland and Labrador
1972 in Newfoundland and Labrador
March 1972 sports events in Canada